Gyula Rimanóczy (19 January 1903 – 19 December 1958) architect, one of the important figures of the inter-war year avant garde period.

Rimanóczy was born in Vienna, Austria. He died, aged 55, in Budapest.

Works

Pasarét church, Budapest

Prizes
1953- received Ybl prize for his life work. Also received the Kossuth Prize the same year for his role in the building of the Budapest Technical University "R" wing.

Legacy
His collected works are archived in the Architecture Museum.

References

1958 deaths
1903 births
20th-century Hungarian architects